Jan Sharp (16 May 1946 – 24 July 2012) was an Australian film producer, director and cinematographer.

Biography

Early life
Jan Sharp was born on 16 May 1946 in Cobram, Australia. She attended Catholic boarding schools in Australia. She graduated from the University of Melbourne, where she studied Fine Arts.

Career
She started her career at Film Australia and later worked for the Australian Broadcasting Corporation. She then worked again at Film Australia, this time as an Associate Producer and Director. Later, she had a weekly column in The Australian and a cultural program on Radio Australia. She continued to work as a film producer in Los Angeles, California.

Personal life
She was married to Australian film producer Phillip Noyce from 1979 to 2004. They had one daughter, Lucia, and Sharp had a daughter, Alice, by a previous relationship with the well-known Sydney-based artist and cartoonist Michael Lodge. She resided in the former private residence of actress Barbara Stanwyck (1907–1990). She died on 24 July 2012 in Los Angeles, California.

Legacy
The 39th Telluride Film Festival in 2013 was dedicated to her.

Filmography

As a producer
Sue and Mario: The Italian Australians (1979).
Peter Kenna's The Good Wife (1987).
Wide Sargasso Sea (1993).
Damage Control (2008).
Beard: Pecking Order (2010).

As an executive producer
Echoes of Paradise (1987).
Rick Michele and Scarlett (2010).

As a director
Jenny (1978).
Damage Control (2008).
Beard: Pecking Order (2010).
Rick Michele and Scarlett (2010).

As a cinematographer
Damage Control (2008).

As an editor
Damage Control (2008).

References

External links

1946 births
2012 deaths
People from Victoria (Australia)
People from Los Angeles
University of Melbourne alumni
Australian film producers
Australian film directors
Australian women film directors
Australian cinematographers
Australian women cinematographers